The 2005 Arlington mayoral election was held on May 7, 2005 to elect the mayor of Arlington. The election was officially nonpartisan. It saw the reelection of incumbent mayor Robert Cluck.

If no candidate had obtained a majority of the vote, a runoff would have been held.

Results

References

Arlington mayoral
Arlington
2005
Non-partisan elections